Glycymeris undata, or the Atlantic bittersweet, is a species of bivalve mollusc in the family Glycymerididae. It can be found along the Atlantic coast of North America, ranging from North Carolina to the West Indies and Brazil.

References

undata
Molluscs described in 1758
Taxa named by Carl Linnaeus